Zella Day is the self-titled EP by American singer and songwriter Zella Day, released on September 23, 2014 by B3SCI Records and Pinetop Records.

In April 2014, "Sweet Ophelia" was the first single released from the EP. Its B-side was "1965". Each track earned a top 10 position on Hype Machine's chart. The "Sweet Ophelia" music video, directed by Gianennio Salucci, was released April 7, 2014 a day ahead of the 7" release by tastemaker B3Sci Records in coordination with Zella's Pinetop Records, an imprint of Hollywood Records.

The EP was celebrated as an "intangible tapestry of sound and raw emotion, blanketing the pop, alternative, and folk genres" by Atwood. It peaked at #16 on the Billboard Heatseekers Chart and garnered critical acclaim from The FADER, The Guardian (New Band of the Week), Pigeons and Planes, NYLON, The Line of Best Fit, Noisey (VICE), Interview Magazine, and Paste Magazine. The final track on the EP, "Hypnotic", was picked as an iTunes Single of the Week and would go on to be featured as the second single from the album.

Track listing

Charts

References 

2014 albums
Zella Day albums